The Edson Hills are a group of mainly ice-free hills lying south of Drake Icefall and west of Union Glacier in the Heritage Range of the Ellsworth Mountains in Antarctica. They were named by the University of Minnesota Ellsworth Mountains Party, 1962–63, for Dean T. Edson, a United States Geological Survey topographic engineer with the party.

Features
Geographical features include:

 Buggisch Peak
 Drake Icefall
 Elvers Peak
 Hyde Glacier
 Kosco Peak
 Lester Peak
 Union Glacier

References 

Hills of Ellsworth Land